BMW Brilliance (officially BMW Brilliance Automotive Ltd.) is an automobile manufacturing company headquartered in Shenyang, China and a joint venture between BMW (as majority holder) and Brilliance Auto. Its principal activity is the production, distribution and sale of BMW passenger cars in mainland China.

The BMW Brilliance Zinoro all-electric crossover, based on the BMW X1 (E84), is the first product of BMW Brilliance’s new brand and the first new energy vehicle (NEV) from a Chinese premium manufacturer. Since early 2014 the Zinoro 1E is available for leasing only in Beijing and Shanghai.

History
On 27 March 2003 BMW and Brilliance Auto agreed to form a joint venture to produce BMW cars for the Chinese market, with BMW holding a 50 per cent stake, Brilliance Auto 40.5 per cent and the Shenyang municipal government 9.5 per cent. BMW and Brilliance agreed to invest an initial €450 million (US$483 million) in the venture. The first Chinese-made BMW, a BMW 325, was sold in October 2003.

In April 2009 BMW Brilliance announced that it would construct a second automobile assembly plant in China. Construction of the plant began in Shenyang in June 2010, with a planned cost of US$73.53 million and a production capacity of 100,000 units. Production at the plant began in May 2012.

In January 2011 BMW Brilliance announced that it would begin Chinese production of a BMW 5 series electric hybrid car later that year.

In 2013, BMW Brilliance opened a research and development centre. It was expanded in 2020, making it BMW’s largest R&D centre outside of Germany. 

In October 2018, BMW announced that it would increase its stake from 50% to 75%, making BMW the first foreign carmaker to take majority control of its joint venture in China.

In February 2022, BMW acquired a majority 75% stake in BMW Brilliance with Brilliance indirectly owning the remaining 25% of the company.

Products
BMW Brilliance currently produces the following vehicles:
BMW 1 Series (F52) (1.5 litre and 2.0 litre)
BMW 2 Series Active Tourer (F45) (1.5 litre and 2.0 litre)
BMW 3 Series (G20/21) (1.6 litre, 2.0 litre and 3.0 litre)
BMW 5 Series (G38) (2.0 litre, 3.0 litre and Hybrid version)
BMW X1 (F49) (1.5 litre, 2.0 litre and Hybrid version)
BMW X3 (G08) (2.0 litre and iX3)

Former products
BMW 3 Series (E46) (2.0 litre and 2.5 litre) (2004)
BMW 3 Series (E90) (2.0 litre and 2.5 litre) (2005-2012)
BMW 3 Series (F30/35) (1.6 litre 2.0 litre and 3.0 litre) (2013-2019)
BMW 5 Series (E60) (2.2 litre to 3.0 litre) (2004-2010)
BMW 5 Series (F18) (2.0 litre and 3.0 litre) (2011-2017)

Gallery

Zinoro vehicles

Zinoro is a vehicle brand under BMW Brilliance specializing in electric vehicles.

Zinoro 1E
Zinoro 60H

Sales

References

External links
BMW Brilliance page: English, Chinese

Car manufacturers of China
Companies based in Shenyang
BMW
Brilliance Auto
Electric vehicle manufacturers of China
Chinese companies established in 2003
Vehicle manufacturing companies established in 2003
Chinese-foreign joint-venture companies